The Dovzhenko Film Studios (translit. Natsional'na kinostudiya khudozhnikh filmiv imeni O. Dovzhenka) is a former Soviet film production studio in Ukraine that was named after the Soviet film producer, Oleksandr Dovzhenko, in 1957. With the fall of the Soviet Union, the studio became a property of the government of Ukraine. In 2000, the film studio was awarded national status.

History

The studios began in 1920s when the All-Ukrainian Photo-Cinema-Directorate (VUFKU) announced a project proposition for the construction of a cinema factory in 1925. Out of 20 of them was chosen the project of Valerian Rykov, who led his architect group composed of students of the Architectural Department of Kyiv Art Institute in the construction of the O. Dovzhenko Film Studios beginning in 1927. It was at the time the largest in the Ukrainian SSR. Although the filming pavilions were still unfinished a year later, movie production had begun. Many memorial plates are within the studios in memory of the many film producers who had once worked here. One film pavilion is named Shchorsivskyi, because Oleksandr Dovzhenko shot his film Shchors there.  This area of the studios is used as a museum.

The first movie of the film studio was "Ivanko and the Butcher" by director Aksel Lundin and cameraman A. Meines. Filming began on October 12, 1927 and took place at night, as pavilions were being built during the day.  Many talented directors have come to the studio since the first films were shot — Oleksandr Dovzhenko, Arnold Kordium,  Pavlo Dolyna, Leonid Lukov, Ivan Kavaleridze, Igor Savchenko, Favst Lopatynskyi; operators —  Danylo Demutskyi, Yurii Yekelchyk, Mykola Topchii, Yozef Rona, I. Shekker, Oleksii Pankratiev; writers — Mykola Bazhan, Oleksandr Korniichuk, Hordii Brasiuk, V. Okhrimenko. It immediately affected the number and quality of the works and the variety of movie genres. In 1929, 10 films were already made.

Since 1930, cinema has become under the control of the state and has served to spread the ideology of communism among the population. Still, the 1930s for the Kyiv Film Factory were important years of formation.

In October 1941, the studio was evacuated to Tashkent, where it will continue its activities until the liberation of Kyiv. During the German occupation of Kyiv, the studio premises were used as a production base for the creation of propaganda films by the Ukraine Film Society.

The apple orchard on the side of the avenue near the studios was planted by the order of Dovzhenko himself. In 1957, it was named in memory of Oleksandr Dovzhenko.

Since 1987, the Debut, specialized in the first films of directors. His managers were Alexander Adolov (until 1990) and Arthur Voattsky (after 1990).

In December 2009, a studio for the digital restoration of Ukrainian films was opened on the complex.

The Dovzhenko National Film Studio is an enterprise with a full complex technological cycle. Along with the shooting of its own films, the film studio provides services to other film and television companies in the production of their products, belongs to the producers of national films in Ukraine, approved by the Cabinet of Ministers of Ukraine from January 26, 2011 № 48.

Selected films

Soviet Union
 1929 Человек с киноаппаратом / Man with a Movie Camera, directed by Dziga Vertov (documentary film)
 1930 Земля / Earth, directed by Alexander Dovzhenko (silent film)
 1932 Иван / Ivan, directed by Alexander Dovzhenko (silent film)
 1935 Аэроград / Aerograd, directed by Alexander Dovzhenko (science fiction)
 1939 Щорс / Shchors, directed by Alexander Dovzhenko (documentary film)
 1941 Богдан Хмельницкий / Bohdan Khmelnytsky, directed by Ihor Savchenko (historical)
 1951 Тарас Шевченко / Taras Shevchenko, directed by Ihor Savchenko (biographical)
 1960 Вдали от Родины / Far from the Motherland, directed by Aleksei Shvachko (espionage)
 1961 За двумя зайцами / Chasing Two Hares, directed by Viktor Ivanov (comedy)
 1963 Королева бензоколонки / Queen of the Gas Station, directed by Mykola Litus and Oleksiy Mishurin (comedy)
 1964 Тіні забутих предків / Shadows of Forgotten Ancestors, directed by Sergei Parajanov (historical)
 1964 Туманность Андромеды / The Andromeda Nebula, directed by Yevheniy Sherstobitov (science fiction)
 1968 Анничка / Annychka, directed by Borys Ivchenko
 1970 Білий птах з чорною ознакою / White Bird with Black Mark, directed by Yuriy Illienko
 1972 Пропала грамота / The Lost Letter, directed by Borys Ivchenko (comedy)
 1973 В бой идут одни «старики» / Only Old Men are Going to Battle, directed by Leonid Bykov (historical)
 1976 Аты-баты, шли солдаты... / Aty-baty, Soldiers were Going..., directed by Leonid Bykov (historical)
 1976 Тревожный месяц вересень / The Troubled Month of Veresen, directed by Leonid Osyka (historical)
 1978 Дознание пилота Пиркса / Test pilota Pirxa, directed by Marek Piestrak
 1980 Ярослав Мудрый / Yaroslav the Wise, directed by Hryhoriy Kokhan (historical)
 1981 Така пізня, така тепла осінь / Such Late, Such Warm Autumn, directed by Ivan Mykolaichuk
 1988 Новые приключения Янки при дворе короля Артура / New Adventures of a Yankee in King Arthur's Court, directed by Viktor Hres

Ukraine
 1991 Голод-33 / Famine-33, directed by Oles Yanchuk
 1991 Чудо в краю забуття / Miracle in the Land of Oblivion, directed by Natalia Motuzko
 1995 Атентат - осіннє вбивство в Мюнхені / Assassination. An Autumn Murder in Munich, directed by Oles Yanchuk
 1995 Москаль-чарівник / Moskal-Charivnyk, directed by Mykola Zasieyev-Rudenko
 1997 Приятель небіжчика / A Friend of the Deceased, directed by Viacheslav Kryshtofovych
 2000 Нескорений / The Undefeated (2000 film), directed by Oles Yanchuk
 2001 Молитва за гетьмана Мазепу / Prayer for Hetman Mazepa, directed by Yuriy Illienko
 2002 Чорна Рада / Chorna Rada (The Black Council), directed by Mykola Zasieiev-Rudenko
 2004 Залізна Сотня / The Company Of Heroes, directed by Oles Yanchuk
 2008 Владика Андрей / Metropolitan Andrey, directed by Oles Yanchuk
 2008 Закон / The Law, directed by Vitaliy Potrukh (short film)
 2009 Хай Бог розсудить їх ... / Let God Judge Them, directed by Yevhen Khvorostianko (short film)
 2012 Гайдамака / Haidamaka, directed by Roman Synchuk (short film)
 2012 Метелик / The Butterfly, directed by Maxim Neafit Bujnicki
 2012 Мамо, я льотчика люблю! / Mom, I Love a Pilot!, directed by Oleksandr Ihnatusha
 2013 Красна Маланка /Krasna Malanka,  directed by Dmytro Sukholytkyy-Sobchuk
 2015 Загублене місто / Lost City, directed by Vitaliy Potrukh

See also
 Kyivnaukfilm
 List of Ukrainian films
 National Cinematheque of Ukraine
 Odessa Film Studio
 History of Ukrainian animation

References

 Ruta Malikenaite. Guildebook: Touring Kyiv. Kyiv: Baltia Druk, 2003.

External links
 
  Non-official site of Olexandr Dovzhenko Film Studios

 
Film production companies of the Soviet Union
Film production companies of Ukraine
Companies based in Kyiv
Buildings and structures in Kyiv
1927 establishments in Ukraine
Tourist attractions in Kyiv
Ukrainian film studios
Buildings and structures completed in 1927
Prospect Beresteiskyi
Mass media companies established in 1927
Government-owned companies of Ukraine